Witmer Lake is a natural lake in LaGrange County, Indiana near Wolcottville. It is part of the Indian Lake Chain of five lakes-  Witmer, Westler, Dallas, Hackenberg and Messick Lakes which are connected by the Little Elkhart River. It is the southernmost lake of the five.

References

Lakes of Indiana
Bodies of water of LaGrange County, Indiana